Egelhoff v. Egelhoff, 532 U.S. 141 (2001), is a major decision of the Supreme Court of the United States on federalism, specifically with regards to the preemption powers of federal law over state laws. It sets the precedent that any state statutes having a "connection with" ERISA plans are superseded by ERISA, or any future substantially similar law that takes its place. In essence, this decision is a reaffirmation of the right and ability of the federal government to, at least in some instances, pre-empt state laws.

Background
Washington resident David A. Egelhoff was married to Donna Rae Egelhoff, and during that time he designated her as the beneficiary of a life insurance policy and pension plan provided by his employer, The Boeing Company. The life insurance policy & pension were governed by the Employee Retirement Income Security Act of 1974 (ERISA), a piece of federal legislation concerning pension and life insurance programs. David Egelhoff subsequently divorced his wife, but did not immediately remove her as a beneficiary.  Weeks after the divorce had been finalized, David Egelhoff was killed in a car accident. David Egelhoff's children, from a previous marriage, filed suit against Donna Rae Egelhoff for the benefits (life insurance and pension) from their deceased father. The case was considered under Washington state law wherein the designation of a spouse as beneficiary to "nonprobate asset," a life insurance policy or employee benefit plan, is revoked immediately upon the divorce of the designator and the beneficiary. However, under ERISA, this was not the case, and Donna Rae Egelhoff would be the beneficiary of her late ex-husband's benefits.

The trial court decided that ERISA pre-empted Washington state law, and granted Donna Rae Egelhoff the benefits she sought. The Washington Court of Appeals reversed this decision, claiming that the federal law did not supersede state law. The Supreme Court of Washington affirmed this decision, citing that, because the Statute did not "refer to" or have a "connection with" an ERISA plan, the state law would be most appropriate. The Supreme Court granted certiorari and heard the case.

Decision
The Supreme Court disagreed with the decision of the Washington State Supreme Court, and instead ruled that this law did, in fact, have a "connection with" an ERISA plan, and was therefore pre-empted by the federal legislation. According to the decision, the criteria used to determine whether or not a state law has a connection with ERISA, "the Court looks both to ERISA’s objectives as a guide to the scope of the state law that Congress understood would survive, as well as to the nature of the state law’s effect on ERISA plans." Further, the Court believed it, "interfere[d] with nationally uniform plan administration." The Court reasoned that this sort of state law was precisely the sort of situation that ERISA sought to remedy in the first place, and ruled that if it were allowed it would effectively render much of ERISA unenforceable.

See also
 List of United States Supreme Court cases, volume 532
 List of United States Supreme Court cases

External links
 

United States Supreme Court cases
United States Supreme Court cases of the Rehnquist Court
United States federal preemption law
Employee Retirement Income Security Act of 1974
2001 in United States case law
Legal history of Washington (state)